Sir Ernest Daryl Lindsay (31 December 1889, in Creswick, Victoria – 25 December 1976, in Mornington), known  as Dan Lindsay, was an Australian artist.

Early life
He was the youngest son in a large family born to Anglo-Irish surgeon Robert Charles Alexander and Jane Elizabeth Lindsay (née Williams), of Creswick, Victoria, who had ten children.  Daryl and his brothers Percy (the eldest), Lionel, and Norman, achieved distinction in the arts. Ruby, also an artist, became well known in artistic circles as the wife of the cartoonist/illustrator/journalist Will Dyson.

Prior to World War I, Daryl became a jackaroo near Collarenebri.

Military service
He served with the AIF in France.

Following his active service in France, In England he made a very substantial contributions to the advancement of military reconstructive surgery with the extensive set of images he produced for Sir Harold Gillies, while serving as Lieutenant D./E. Lindsay, the official "medical artist" at the specialist military hospital at Sidcup, in Kent.

Formal studies
He made many contacts in the art world and studied at the Slade School of Art in London.

He had moderate success with his paintings of white flowers - a difficult subject to capture successfully.

Career
Returning to Australia he became fascinated with the ballet during first tour (1936–1937) of "Colonel W. de Basil's Monte Carlo Russian Ballet" (i.e., the Ballets Russes) to Australia, sketching them during rehearsals, as in their performances performances.

He later published a book of his sketches, Back stage with the Covent Garden Russian ballet, and illustrated Arnold Haskell's memoirs, Dancing Round the World: Memoirs of an Attempted Escape from Ballet.

In 1940, he became a curator at the National Gallery of Victoria, rising to director from 1942 to 1956.

He also became a member of the Commonwealth Art Advisory Board in 1953.  On 31 May 1956 he was knighted for "services to art".

Personal life
In 1922, in England, he married Joan à Beckett Weigall, who, as Joan Lindsay, would later write Picnic at Hanging Rock. When the couple returned to live in Australia, they built a house called Mulberry Hill at Langwarrin South, on the Mornington Peninsula, and lived there until the Great Depression forced them to take more humble lodgings in Bacchus Marsh, renting out their home until the economic situation improved. Joan Lindsay left Mulberry Hill to the National Trust when she died in 1984.

Death
He died on Christmas Day 1976, in Mornington, Victoria, six days before his 87th birthday. He was survived by his wife. They had no children.

Publications
Back Stage with the Covent Garden Russian Ballet (Sydney: s.n., 1938?)
F. Philipp and J. Stewart, eds., In Honour of Daryl Lindsay: Essays and Studies (Melbourne: Oxford University Press, 1964)
 The Leafy Tree: My Family (Melbourne: F. W. Cheshire, 1965).

See also
 1916 Pioneer Exhibition Game

Notes

References
 First World War Embarkation Roll: Driver Daryl Ernest Lindsay (10883), collection of the Australian War Museum.
 First World War Nominal Roll: Lieutenant Daryl Ernest Lindsay, collection of the Australian War Museum.
 First World War Service Record Lieutenant Daryl Ernest Lindsay, National Archives of Australia.

Further reading
 Joanna Mendelssohn, Lionel Lindsay : An artist and His Family, London : Chatto & Windus, 1988

External links
Lindsay's work in the National Library of Australia
Daryl Lindsay, Papers, 1929-1976 (MS4864), National Library of Australia

1890 births
1976 deaths
Australian Knights Bachelor
20th-century Australian painters
20th-century Australian male artists
People from Creswick, Victoria
Artists from Victoria (Australia)
Australian male painters
Medical illustrators
Australian military personnel of World War I
Military personnel from Victoria (Australia)
Australian people of English descent
Australian people of Irish descent
Lindsay family